Bete people hail from Bete Town, Takum, Nigeria. They speak the nearly extinct Bete language. 

Ethnic groups in Nigeria